Indo-Norwegian Project  was Norway's first foreign aid development project.
The project was first established in Neendakara, near  Quilon, Kerala in 1953, and the aim was  modernisation of fisheries of Kerala, but also including health, sanitation and water supply.(including building a water pipe factory) The project was moved to Ernakulam in 1961, now focusing on fisheries only. At Ernakulam an iceplant and workshop with slipway for fishing vessels were built. During the years 1952–1972, Norway gave technical and financial assistance to India to the tune of 120 million Norwegian kroners.

See also
India–Norway relations

References

Further reading
Arne Martin Klausen: Kerala fishermen and the Indo-Norwegian pilot project. Prio Monographs from the International Peace Research Institute, Oslo. Oslo: Universitetsforlaget (published for Scandinavian University Books), 1968.

Economy of Kerala
Fishing in India
Foreign aid to India
India–Norway relations
1953 establishments in India
Ernakulam district